George G. Groesback is a Democratic Party member of the Montana House of Representatives, representing District 74 since 2004.

External links
Montana House of Representatives - George Groesback official MT State Legislature website
Project Vote Smart - Representative George G. Groesback (MT) profile
Follow the Money - George Groesback
2008 2006 2004 campaign contributions

Democratic Party members of the Montana House of Representatives
1953 births
Living people